The Chertanovo Constituency (No.210) is a Russian legislative constituency in Moscow. It is based in Southern and South-Western Moscow.

Members elected

Election results

1993

|-
! colspan=2 style="background-color:#E9E9E9;text-align:left;vertical-align:top;" |Candidate
! style="background-color:#E9E9E9;text-align:left;vertical-align:top;" |Party
! style="background-color:#E9E9E9;text-align:right;" |Votes
! style="background-color:#E9E9E9;text-align:right;" |%
|-
|style="background-color:#0085BE"|
|align=left|Sergey Kovalyov
|align=left|Choice of Russia
|50,175
|23.35%
|-
|style="background-color:"|
|align=left|Viktor Kobelev
|align=left|Liberal Democratic Party
| -
|8.49%
|-
| colspan="5" style="background-color:#E9E9E9;"|
|- style="font-weight:bold"
| colspan="3" style="text-align:left;" | Total
| 214,877
| 100%
|-
| colspan="5" style="background-color:#E9E9E9;"|
|- style="font-weight:bold"
| colspan="4" |Source:
|
|}

1995

|-
! colspan=2 style="background-color:#E9E9E9;text-align:left;vertical-align:top;" |Candidate
! style="background-color:#E9E9E9;text-align:left;vertical-align:top;" |Party
! style="background-color:#E9E9E9;text-align:right;" |Votes
! style="background-color:#E9E9E9;text-align:right;" |%
|-
|style="background-color:#3A46CE"|
|align=left|Sergey Kovalyov (incumbent)
|align=left|Democratic Choice of Russia – United Democrats
|64,947
|23.35%
|-
|style="background-color:"|
|align=left|Nikolay Maslov
|align=left|Independent
|47,081
|16.93%
|-
|style="background-color:#1A1A1A"|
|align=left|Oleg Rumyantsev
|align=left|Stanislav Govorukhin Bloc
|40,250
|14.47%
|-
|style="background-color:"|
|align=left|Nikolay Troshkin
|align=left|Communist Party
|37,886
|13.62%
|-
|style="background-color:"|
|align=left|Dmitry Vasilyev
|align=left|Independent
|9,460
|3.40%
|-
|style="background-color:#DA2021"|
|align=left|Vadim Pechenev
|align=left|Ivan Rybkin Bloc
|6,282
|2.26%
|-
|style="background-color:"|
|align=left|Mikhail Karpenko
|align=left|Education - Future of Russia
|5,705
|2.05%
|-
|style="background-color:"|
|align=left|Vladimir Rebrikov
|align=left|Independent
|5,304
|1.91%
|-
|style="background-color:#192082"|
|align=left|Nikolay Pilipeshin
|align=left|Frontier Generation
|4,858
|1.75%
|-
|style="background-color:"|
|align=left|Andrey Poteryakhin
|align=left|Independent
|4,429
|1.59%
|-
|style="background-color:#5A5A58"|
|align=left|Vadim Burlak
|align=left|Federal Democratic Movement
|4,338
|1.56%
|-
|style="background-color:"|
|align=left|Vyacheslav Mavrodi
|align=left|Independent
|1,764
|0.63%
|-
|style="background-color:#000000"|
|colspan=2 |against all
|39,043
|14.04%
|-
| colspan="5" style="background-color:#E9E9E9;"|
|- style="font-weight:bold"
| colspan="3" style="text-align:left;" | Total
| 278,119
| 100%
|-
| colspan="5" style="background-color:#E9E9E9;"|
|- style="font-weight:bold"
| colspan="4" |Source:
|
|}

1999

|-
! colspan=2 style="background-color:#E9E9E9;text-align:left;vertical-align:top;" |Candidate
! style="background-color:#E9E9E9;text-align:left;vertical-align:top;" |Party
! style="background-color:#E9E9E9;text-align:right;" |Votes
! style="background-color:#E9E9E9;text-align:right;" |%
|-
|style="background-color:#3B9EDF"|
|align=left|Sergey Shokhin
|align=left|Fatherland – All Russia
|111,763
|36.68%
|-
|style="background-color:#1042A5"|
|align=left|Aleksey Ulyukaev
|align=left|Union of Right Forces
|43,073
|14.14%
|-
|style="background-color:"|
|align=left|Nikolay Taranyov
|align=left|Communist Party
|27,207
|8.93%
|-
|style="background-color:"|
|align=left|Natalya Ilyina
|align=left|Independent
|26,401
|8.67%
|-
|style="background-color:"|
|align=left|Anatoly Nemov
|align=left|Independent
|17,491
|5.74%
|-
|style="background-color:#020266"|
|align=left|Yury Naumov
|align=left|Russian Socialist Party
|6,284
|2.06%
|-
|style="background-color:#084284"|
|align=left|Vadim Pechenev
|align=left|Spiritual Heritage
|4,558
|1.50%
|-
|style="background-color:#000000"|
|colspan=2 |against all
|58,203
|19.10%
|-
| colspan="5" style="background-color:#E9E9E9;"|
|- style="font-weight:bold"
| colspan="3" style="text-align:left;" | Total
| 304,669
| 100%
|-
| colspan="5" style="background-color:#E9E9E9;"|
|- style="font-weight:bold"
| colspan="4" |Source:
|
|}

2001
The results of the by-election were invalidated due to low turnout.

|-
! colspan=2 style="background-color:#E9E9E9;text-align:left;vertical-align:top;" |Candidate
! style="background-color:#E9E9E9;text-align:left;vertical-align:top;" |Party
! style="background-color:#E9E9E9;text-align:right;" |Votes
! style="background-color:#E9E9E9;text-align:right;" |%
|-
|style="background-color:"|
|align=left|Vladimir Gruzdev
|align=left|Independent
|
|70.39%
|-
|style="background-color:"|
|align=left|Yury Abramov
|align=left|Independent
|
|8.41%
|-
|style="background-color:"|
|align=left|Vladimir Ageychenkov
|align=left|Independent
|
|3.97%
|-
|style="background-color:"|
|align=left|Nikolay Zhdanov-Lutsenko
|align=left|Independent
|
|3.71%
|-
|style="background-color:"|
|align=left|Valery Zhilin
|align=left|Independent
|
|2.58%
|-
|style="background-color:#000000"|
|colspan=2 |against all
|
|8.50%
|-
| colspan="5" style="background-color:#E9E9E9;"|
|- style="font-weight:bold"
| colspan="3" style="text-align:left;" | Total
| 95,501
| 100%
|-
| colspan="5" style="background-color:#E9E9E9;"|
|- style="font-weight:bold"
| colspan="4" |Source:
|
|}

2003

|-
! colspan=2 style="background-color:#E9E9E9;text-align:left;vertical-align:top;" |Candidate
! style="background-color:#E9E9E9;text-align:left;vertical-align:top;" |Party
! style="background-color:#E9E9E9;text-align:right;" |Votes
! style="background-color:#E9E9E9;text-align:right;" |%
|-
|style="background-color:"|
|align=left|Vladimir Gruzdev
|align=left|United Russia
|149,069
|53.78%
|-
|style="background-color:#1042A5"|
|align=left|Vladimir Kara-Murza
|align=left|Union of Right Forces
|23,800
|8.59%
|-
|style="background-color:"|
|align=left|Sergey Seregin
|align=left|Communist Party
|18,992
|6.85%
|-
|style="background-color:"|
|align=left|Yelena Yakovleva
|align=left|Independent
|9,191
|3.32%
|-
|style="background-color:"|
|align=left|Nikolay Sokolov
|align=left|Liberal Democratic Party
|5,784
|2.09%
|-
|style="background-color:#00A1FF"|
|align=left|Yury Timofeev
|align=left|Party of Russia's Rebirth-Russian Party of Life
|4,950
|1.79%
|-
|style="background-color:"|
|align=left|Vladimir Rebrikov
|align=left|National Patriotic Forces of Russia
|4,347
|1.57%
|-
|style="background-color:"|
|align=left|Yevgeny Shvets
|align=left|Independent
|4,250
|1.53%
|-
|style="background-color:"|
|align=left|Maksim Krasikov
|align=left|Independent
|3,350
|1.21%
|-
|style="background-color:#164C8C"|
|align=left|Vyacheslav Palashchenko
|align=left|United Russian Party Rus'
|1,449
|0.52%
|-
|style="background-color:#000000"|
|colspan=2 |against all
|47,597
|17.17%
|-
| colspan="5" style="background-color:#E9E9E9;"|
|- style="font-weight:bold"
| colspan="3" style="text-align:left;" | Total
| 278,730
| 100%
|-
| colspan="5" style="background-color:#E9E9E9;"|
|- style="font-weight:bold"
| colspan="4" |Source:
|
|}

2016

|-
! colspan=2 style="background-color:#E9E9E9;text-align:left;vertical-align:top;" |Candidate
! style="background-color:#E9E9E9;text-align:left;vertical-align:top;" |Party
! style="background-color:#E9E9E9;text-align:right;" |Votes
! style="background-color:#E9E9E9;text-align:right;" |%
|-
|style="background-color:"|
|align=left|Anatoly Vyborny
|align=left|United Russia
|65,144
|40.94%
|-
|style="background-color:"|
|align=left|Denis Davydov
|align=left|Communist Party
|18,700
|11.75%
|-
|style="background-color:"|
|align=left|Platon Grekov
|align=left|Liberal Democratic Party
|13,505
|8.49%
|-
|style="background-color:"|
|align=left|Vladimir Kochetkov
|align=left|A Just Russia
|11,554
|7.26%
|-
|style="background-color:"|
|align=left|Aleksey Krapukhin
|align=left|Yabloko
|11,312
|7.11%
|-
|style="background:;"| 
|align=left|Nikolay Topornin
|align=left|Party of Growth
|5,923
|3.72%
|-
|style="background:;"| 
|align=left|Dmitry Androsov
|align=left|People's Freedom Party
|5,334
|3.35%
|-
|style="background:;"| 
|align=left|Mark Chumakov
|align=left|Communists of Russia
|5,316
|3.34%
|-
|style="background:;"| 
|align=left|Denis Merkulov
|align=left|Rodina
|4,910
|3.09%
|-
|style="background: ;"| 
|align=left|Andrey Tsitsilin
|align=left|The Greens
|4,818
|3.03%
|-
|style="background:"| 
|align=left|Vadim Kokarev
|align=left|Patriots of Russia
|4,208
|2.64%
|-
|style="background:#00A650;"| 
|align=left|Pyotr Shcherbachenko
|align=left|Civilian Power
|2,157
|1.36%
|-
|style="background:;"| 
|align=left|Mikhail Rastashansky
|align=left|Civic Platform
|1,307
|0.82%
|-
| colspan="5" style="background-color:#E9E9E9;"|
|- style="font-weight:bold"
| colspan="3" style="text-align:left;" | Total
| 159,138
| 100%
|-
| colspan="5" style="background-color:#E9E9E9;"|
|- style="font-weight:bold"
| colspan="4" |Source:
|
|}

2021

|-
! colspan=2 style="background-color:#E9E9E9;text-align:left;vertical-align:top;" |Candidate
! style="background-color:#E9E9E9;text-align:left;vertical-align:top;" |Party
! style="background-color:#E9E9E9;text-align:right;" |Votes
! style="background-color:#E9E9E9;text-align:right;" |%
|-
|style="background-color: " |
|align=left|Roman Romanenko
|align=left|United Russia
|91,161
|40.23%
|-
|style="background-color: " |
|align=left|Mikhail Tarantsov
|align=left|Communist Party
|56,025
|24.72%
|-
|style="background-color: "|
|align=left|Mikhail Nachevsky
|align=left|New People
|17,198
|7.59%
|-
|style="background-color: "|
|align=left|Vladimir Butkeev
|align=left|A Just Russia — For Truth
|16,082
|7.10%
|-
|style="background-color: " |
|align=left|Vladislav Korshunkov
|align=left|Liberal Democratic Party
|10,079
|4.45%
|-
|style="background: ;"| 
|align=left|Yevgeny Barmenkov
|align=left|The Greens
|8,420
|3.72%
|-
|style="background-color: " |
|align=left|Aleksey Krapukhin
|align=left|Yabloko
|6,802
|3.00%
|-
|style="background-color: " |
|align=left|Leonid Tarashchansky
|align=left|Communists of Russia
|5,659
|2.50%
|-
|style="background-color: "|
|align=left|Arseny Yatsevsky
|align=left|Russian Party of Freedom and Justice
|4,616
|2.04%
|-
|style="background: ;"| 
|align=left|Anatoly Batashev
|align=left|Green Alternative
|3,988
|1.76%
|-
|style="background: ;"| 
|align=left|Stepan Smitienko
|align=left|Civic Platform
|2,629
|1.16%
|-
| colspan="5" style="background-color:#E9E9E9;"|
|- style="font-weight:bold"
| colspan="3" style="text-align:left;" | Total
| 226,596
| 100%
|-
| colspan="5" style="background-color:#E9E9E9;"|
|- style="font-weight:bold"
| colspan="4" |Source:
|
|}

Notes

Sources
210. Чертановский одномандатный избирательный округ

References

Russian legislative constituencies
Politics of Moscow